DHA-paclitaxel (or Taxoprexin) is an investigational drug (from Protarga Inc) made by linking paclitaxel to docosahexaenoic acid (DHA), a fatty acid that is easily taken up by tumor cells; the DHA-paclitaxel “appears not to be cytotoxic until the bond with DHA  is cleaved within the cell.” The advantage of DHA-paclitaxel over paclitaxel is DHA-paclitaxel's ability to carry much higher concentrations of paclitaxel to the cells, which are maintained for longer periods in the tumor cells, thus increasing their action. With increased activity, DHA-paclitaxel, also known as Taxoprexin, may have a more successful response in cancer patients than Taxol, and it may be able to treat more types of cancer than Taxol has been able to treat.

Clinical trials
In 2007, a phase II clinical trial reported "modest activity in patients with oesophago-gastric cancer".

References

Experimental cancer drugs
Taxanes